City Hospital railway station, situated on Donegall Road, serves Belfast City Hospital and the surrounding area of south Belfast, Northern Ireland. It is one of the four stations located in the city centre, the others being Great Victoria Street, Botanic, and Lanyon Place.

The station opened on 6 October 1986, and is very close to Botanic Station

Service

On Sundays, the Bangor, Portadown and Larne Line services all reduce to hourly operation.

References

Railway stations in Belfast
Railway stations opened in 1986
Railway stations opened by NI Railways
Railway stations served by NI Railways
1986 establishments in Northern Ireland
Railway stations in Northern Ireland opened in the 20th century